Dolichogyna is a genus of hoverflies.

Species
D. chiliensis Walker, 1836
D. minotaurus Speiser, 1914

Subgenus: Dolichogyna

Subgenus: Nosodepus

References

Diptera of South America
Eristalinae
Hoverfly genera
Taxa named by Pierre-Justin-Marie Macquart